is a railway station in the town of Iide, Yamagata Prefecture, Japan, operated by East Japan Railway Company (JR East).

Lines
Hagyū Station is served by the Yonesaka Line, and is located 27.3 rail kilometers from the terminus of the line at Yonezawa Station.

Station layout
The station has one side platform serving s single bi-directional track. The station is unattended.

History
Hagyū Station opened on August 10, 1931. The station was absorbed into the JR East network upon the privatization of JNR on April 1, 1987.

Surrounding area
The station is located in a rural area, with only one small convenience store located in the close vicinity.

See also
List of Railway Stations in Japan

External links

 JR East Station information 

Railway stations in Yamagata Prefecture
Yonesaka Line
Railway stations in Japan opened in 1931
Stations of East Japan Railway Company
Iide, Yamagata